The bamboo rats are four species of rodents of the subfamily Rhizomyinae. They are the sole living representatives of the tribe Rhizomyini. All are found in South Asia, Southeast Asia and East Asia.

The species are:
The Chinese bamboo rat, Rhizomys sinensis, found in central and southern China, northern Burma, and Vietnam; 
The hoary bamboo rat, R. pruinosus, found from Assam in India to southeastern China and the Malay Peninsula; 
The Sumatra, Indomalayan, or large bamboo rat, R. sumatrensis, found in Yunnan in China, Indochina, the Malay Peninsula and Sumatra. 
The lesser bamboo rat, Cannomys badius, found in Nepal, Assam, northern Bangladesh, Burma, Thailand, Laos, Cambodia and northern Vietnam.

However, they are all bulky, slow-moving rodents that live and forage in extensive burrow systems and rarely spend much time above ground. They feed on the underground parts of plants. The lesser bamboo rat is more variable in its habitat, living in grassy areas, forests, and sometimes gardens, and eats a wider variety of vegetation.

All bamboo rats are regarded as agricultural pests since they eat the roots of a range of crop plants such as tapioca, sugar cane, and tea bushes, but they are also recognised as valuable food animals.

The bamboo rats are the natural hosts for the disease-causing mold, Talaromyces marneffei, which is endemic in all species in Southeast Asia. In this area, talaromycosis due to the mold is the third most common opportunistic infection in HIV-positive individuals.

References

Spalacidae
Rodents by common name